The Centennial Conservatory in Thunder Bay, Ontario is located in the city's south end.  It was built in 1965 and opened to the public in 1967 as a Centennial Project to commemorate the Canadian Centennial. The conservatory houses various varieties of tropical plants, flowers, trees and shrubs in its main greenhouse, a cactus room, and a room with seasonal displays. The facility includes paths and benches and a wishing well and is open to the public, year round free of charge.

History

The Centennial Conservatory (also known as the Centennial Botanical Conservatory or the Thunder Bay Conservatory) is a commemorative Centennial Project donated to the citizens of Fort William as their legacy. Construction started in 1965 and was for the most part completed in 1966 leaving one year for seeding and growing. It was finally opened to the public on November 10, 1967. On November 18, 1967, the official opening ceremony was held.

In 1968, one year after the Centennial Conservatory opened to the public, a large banana plant was donated by the Canadian Daughters Assembly 34.

References

Botanical gardens in Canada
Tourist attractions in Thunder Bay District
Greenhouses in Canada
Culture of Thunder Bay
Parks in Thunder Bay